Gustav Eckstein (1875–1916) was an Austrian social democrat, and associate of Karl Kautsky. Apart from that, Eckstein was also a journalist and scholar.

Legacy
Eckstein is usually remembered today for playing a role in communism. Dr. Otto Steiger writes that:

I think that this person could be Gustav Eckstein (1875–1916), socialist (marxian revisionist) and economist. For a broader public he is known as a critic of Rosa Luxemburg's Die Akkumulation des Kapitals. His review of this book has been printed as an appendix in all German editions of Die Akkumulation after Luxembourg's death.

References

1875 births
1916 deaths
Austrian Jews
Austro-Hungarian Jews
Jewish Austrian politicians
Social Democratic Party of Austria politicians
19th-century Austrian journalists
20th-century Austrian journalists